Abakan palace ruins are the remains of a Chinese architecture styled palace found near Abakan, Khakassia, Russia, dating back more than 2,000 years ago to the Chinese Han dynasty. It was excavated by Russian archaeologists. The palace was administered by the Xiongnu and the Han dynasty in the old Jiankun region of China. Various other nomadic tribes have lived here like the modern Yenisei and ancient Dingling (Baikal lake). Some believe it may be a palace for Li Ling and his Xiongnu wife. Others contend it was actually Lü Fang's (卢芳) palace.

References 

Han dynasty architecture
 Han dynasty
 Xiongnu
Abakan